The 2019 Louisiana Attorney General election took place on  October 12, 2019 to elect the Attorney General of the state of Louisiana, with a runoff election, held on November 16, 2019. Incumbent  Republican Attorney General Jeff Landry ran for a second term.

Under Louisiana's jungle primary system, all candidates appeared on the same ballot, regardless of party, and voters could vote for any candidate, regardless of their party affiliation.

Candidates

Republican Party

Declared
Jeff Landry, incumbent Attorney General of Louisiana

Democratic Party

Declared
Ike Jackson, business attorney and former general counsel on the Louisiana Department of Natural Resources

General election

Results

References

External links
Official campaign websites
 Ike Jackson (D) for Attorney General 
 Jeff Landry (R) for Attorney General

Attorney General
Louisiana
Louisiana Attorney General elections